Simpson's College, also known as Simpson's College Museum, was a historic school building located at Graham, Nodaway County, Missouri. It was built about 1860, and is a one-story, rectangular frame building, measuring approximately 20 feet by 28 feet. A school occupied the building until 1869, after which it became a private residence. The structure was demolished in 2009.

It was listed on the National Register of Historic Places in 1978.

References

History museums in Missouri
School buildings on the National Register of Historic Places in Missouri
School buildings completed in 1860
Buildings and structures in Nodaway County, Missouri
National Register of Historic Places in Nodaway County, Missouri